Music is the second studio album by the American urban/post-disco group D Train, released in 1983 on Prelude Records via the United States and United Kingdom. The album was remastered by Canadian label Unidisc Music in 1992 including five bonus tracks.

The album was produced by its musical group member Hubert Eaves III. Recording sessions began in late 1982 and finished in mid 1983.

Track listing

CD release

(*) Bonus tracks on the remastered version.

References

External links
Music at Discogs

1983 albums
D Train (music group) albums